Jerry Ward (born 1948), former member of the Alaska Legislature.

Jerry Ward may also refer to:

Jerry Ward, musician in The Strangers (American band)
 Jerry Ward (basketball), see Boston Celtics draft history
Jerry Ward (American football) on List of Dayton Flyers in the NFL Draft

See also
 Gerry Ward (disambiguation)
 Gerald Ward (disambiguation)
 Gerard Ward,see ANU Research School of Asia & the Pacific
 Jeremy Ward (disambiguation)